Impatiens kinabaluensis, the Kinabalu balsam, is a flowering plant in the family Balsaminaceae. It is endemic to Borneo.

Etymology
The genus name Impatiens (Latin for "impatient") refers to the explosive dehiscence of the fruit. The species name kinabaluensis refers to Mount Kinabalu, the type locality.

Description
It has long, rigid stems. The leaves are about 3-4 inches long, dark green, entire, ovate to lanceolate-ovate, ribbed and shiny. The upper surface has a thick, water-repellent cuticula. The flowers are pink-lilac and bloom from April through November.

Distribution
This plant occurs in Kinabalu National Park in Sabah on the island of Borneo.

Habitat

References

External links
 International Plant Names
 Tropicos
 EoL

Further reading
Akiyama, S., et al. 2005. A new species of Impatiens (Balsaminaceae) from Mt. Kinabalu, Borneo. J. Jap. Bot. 80(5) 266–270.
 Ikeda, H., et al. 2005. A cytotaxonomic study of five species of Impatiens (Balsaminaceae) in Java and Borneo, Malesia. J. Jap. Bot. 80(5) 271–77.

kinabaluensis
Endemic flora of Borneo
Plants described in 2005
Flora of Mount Kinabalu
Flora of the Borneo montane rain forests